Bauernschmidt is a surname. Notable people with the surname include:
 Amy Bauernschmidt, American naval officer
 Frederick Bauernschmidt (1864–1933), American brewer and philanthropist